The 1915 Georgia Bulldogs football team represented the Georgia Bulldogs of the University of Georgia during the 1915 college football season. The Bulldogs completed the season with a 5–2–2 record.   Tennessee-Chattanooga joined the Southern Intercollegiate Athletic Association (SIAA) in 1914, so the 1915 game was a conference game.  Due to the loss to Auburn, Georgia finished 3–1–1 in the SIAA.

The only blemish on in-state rival Georgia Tech's record was a scoreless tie with Georgia. John G. Henderson headed a  group of three men, one behind the other with his hands upon the shoulders of the one in front, to counter Heisman's jump shift offense.

Schedule

References

Georgia
Georgia Bulldogs football seasons
Georgia Bulldogs football